"Rumble in the Jungle" is a song recorded for the 1996 documentary film When We Were Kings, which depicts the 1974 boxing match between Muhammad Ali and George Foreman that the song is named after: The Rumble in the Jungle. The song was written and performed by American hip hop group Fugees along with fellow hip hop artists A Tribe Called Quest, Busta Rhymes, and John Forté. Additional writers credited on the song are Benny Andersson, Björn Ulvaeus, Stig Anderson, and Chip Taylor since "Rumble in the Jungle" samples recordings written by them. The lyrics of the song focus mostly on Ali and his life, as well as the boxing match itself.

Produced by Wyclef Jean and Lauryn Hill of the Fugees, "Rumble in the Jungle" was released on January 7, 1997, as the first single from the soundtrack, becoming a chart hit in several countries. In the United Kingdom, it peaked at number three on the UK Singles Chart, becoming the Fugees' fourth consecutive top-three hit. It also became a top-40 hit in Finland, Iceland, Ireland, New Zealand, and Sweden. In the United States, it appeared on the Billboard R&B/Hip-Hop Airplay chart, where it peaked at number 71.

Background and writing
"Rumble in the Jungle" was written for the 1996 documentary film When We Were Kings, which focuses on American boxer Muhammad Ali and the buildup to the 1974 Rumble in the Jungle boxing match with George Foreman, which took place in Kinshasa, Zaire. The song was written by Fugees members Wyclef Jean, Pras, and Lauryn Hill along with guest vocalists Busta Rhymes, John Forté, and A Tribe Called Quest members Q-Tip and Phife Dawg; Jean and Hill additionally produced the song.

The song's bassline is taken from "The Name of the Game" (1977) by Swedish pop group ABBA, so Benny Andersson, Björn Ulvaeus, and Stig Anderson are given writing credits; this was the first time ABBA had granted permission to officially sample one of their recordings. One of Hill's verses is also based on "Angel of the Morning", penned by Chip Taylor in 1967. "Rumble in the Jungle" is about Ali's background and his fight with Foreman, containing descriptions of inner-city life, and plays during the biopic's closing credits.

Release and promotion
The song was serviced to American rhythmic contemporary radio on January 7, 1997. On January 25, 1997, it debuted and peaked at number 71 on the Billboard R&B/Hip-Hop Airplay chart. In the United Kingdom, a re-issue of "Fu-Gee-La" was originally scheduled for release, but once the film and song were released in America, import copies began to permeate the British music market, eventually selling enough units to appear at number 81 on the UK Singles Chart. This threatened the potential sales of "Fu-Gee-La", so its release was suspended to allow for the proper release of "Rumble in the Jungle" on March 3, 1997. The song subsequently reappeared on the UK Singles Chart, entering at number three to become the Fugees' fourth consecutive top-three hit. Elsewhere in Europe, the song peaked at number 10 in Ireland, number 12 in Iceland, number 13 in Finland, and number 36 in Sweden. In Oceania, the song reached the top 20 in New Zealand, peaking at number 13 on June 1, 1997.

A music video directed by Marc Smerling and Mark Woollen was made for the song. If features snippets from the film interspersed with clips of the seven vocalists rapping the song in a boxing ring.

Track listings

US promo CD
 "Rumble in the Jungle" (radio edit) – 4:16
 "Rumble in the Jungle" (extended radio edit) – 4:51
 "Rumble in the Jungle" (full clean version) – 5:09
 "Rumble in the Jungle" (Muhammad Ali snippet) – 0:16
 "I'm So Mean I Make Medicine Sick" (Muhammad Ali snippet) – 0:25
 "We Gonna Get It On Cause We Don't Get Along" (Muhammad Ali snippet) – 0:17
 "Sucker You Ain't Nothing" (Muhammad Ali snippet) – 0:24
 "Tail of a Pony—Soul Music" (Muhammad Ali snippet) – 0:10
 "Mr. Tooth Decay" (Muhammad Ali snippet) – 0:27
 "Ali's Dream" (Muhammad Ali snippet) – 0:33

UK and Australian CD single
 "Rumble in the Jungle" (edit) – 4:16
 "Rumble in the Jungle" (full length) – 5:09
 "I'm So Mean I Make Medicine Sick" (Muhammad Ali snippet) – 0:25
 "Rumble in the Jungle" (a cappella) – 4:48

European CD and cassette single
 "Rumble in the Jungle" (edit) – 4:16
 "Rumble in the Jungle" (full length) – 5:09

Personnel
Personnel are lifted from the US promo CD liner notes.

 Wyclef Jean – writing, production
 Lauryn Hill – writing, production
 Prakazrel Michel – writing
 Kamaal Fareed – writing
 Malik Taylor – writing
 Trevor Smith – writing

 John Forté – writing
 Benny Andersson – writing ("The Name of the Game")
 Björn Ulvaeus – writing ("The Name of the Game")
 Stig Anderson – writing ("The Name of the Game")
 Chip Taylor – writing ("Angel of the Morning")
 Warren Riker – engineering, mixing

Charts

Weekly charts

Year-end charts

Release history

References

1996 songs
1997 singles
Busta Rhymes songs
Fugees songs
Mercury Records singles
Songs about Muhammad Ali
Songs based on actual events
Songs written by Benny Andersson and Björn Ulvaeus
Songs written by Busta Rhymes
Songs written by Chip Taylor
Songs written by Lauryn Hill
Songs written by Phife Dawg
Songs written by Pras
Songs written by Q-Tip (musician)
Songs written by Stig Anderson
Songs written by Wyclef Jean
A Tribe Called Quest songs